Harry Philip Heggie Gourlay (10 July 1916 – 20 April 1987) was a Scottish Labour Party politician.

Gourlay was educated at Kirkcaldy High School and was a vehicles examiner. He served as a councillor on Kirkcaldy Town Council and Fife County Council from 1946 and was a governor of Dundee College of Education and a member of his local hospital board.

Gourlay contested South Angus in 1955.
He was member of parliament for Kirkcaldy Burghs (and then Kirkcaldy) from 1959 until he died in office shortly prior to the 1987 general election, at which Dr. Lewis Moonie was elected as his successor. Gourlay was a Government Whip and a Deputy Speaker from 1964-1970.

References
The Times Guide to the House of Commons, Times Newspapers Ltd, 1955, 1966, 1983 & 1987

External links 
 

1916 births
1987 deaths
Councillors in Fife
Members of the Parliament of the United Kingdom for Fife constituencies
Ministers in the Wilson governments, 1964–1970
People educated at Kirkcaldy High School
Scottish Labour MPs
Scottish Labour councillors
UK MPs 1959–1964
UK MPs 1964–1966
UK MPs 1966–1970
UK MPs 1970–1974
UK MPs 1974
UK MPs 1974–1979
UK MPs 1979–1983
UK MPs 1983–1987